Ocresia is a genus of snout moths. It was described by Émile Louis Ragonot in 1891.

Species
 Ocresia bisinualis Ragonot, 1891
 Ocresia flammealis
 Ocresia pallidalis (Druce, 1902)

References

Chrysauginae
Pyralidae genera
Taxa named by Émile Louis Ragonot